John McCarthy (1862 – 8 February 1893) was an Irish nationalist politician and Member of Parliament (MP) in the House of Commons of the United Kingdom of Great Britain and Ireland.

He was elected as an Irish National Federation (Anti-Parnellite) MP for the Mid Tipperary constituency at the 1892 general election. He died in office in 1893 and the by-election for his seat was won by James Francis Hogan.

References

External links

1862 births
1893 deaths
Anti-Parnellite MPs
Members of the Parliament of the United Kingdom for County Tipperary constituencies (1801–1922)
UK MPs 1892–1895